Imbler v. Pachtman, 424 U.S. 409 (1976), was a United States Supreme Court case in which district attorneys or prosecutors were found to have full immunity from civil suits resulting from their government duties.

Imbler, a defendant in a murder trial, had been convicted and sentenced when the district attorney, Pachtman, revealed new evidence that he said had recently surfaced and which exonerated Imbler.  Imbler used the new evidence to successfully free himself, then brought up a civil suit alleging that Pachtman had withheld evidence.  The suit, however, was dismissed on the grounds that Pachtman had prosecutorial immunity, a finding which the Supreme Court affirmed.

See also
 List of United States Supreme Court cases, volume 424

References

External links
 
 
 Brummet, D. (1979) Chi.-Kent L. Rev. Section 1983, Immunity, and the Public Defender: The Misapplication of Imbler v. Pachtman.

United States substantive due process case law
United States Supreme Court cases
United States Supreme Court cases of the Burger Court
1976 in United States case law